The Small Giant (French: La Petite Géante) is an animated television series that began in 2010. It was animated by Alphanim (now called Gaumont Animation) along with Jiang Toon Animation and distributed by Cookie Jar Entertainment (now called DHX Media). Each of the 52 episodes is around 13 minutes long and the first season was translated into English for American distribution.

Broadcasting
It was broadcast on Gulli beginning September 2010.

Characters
Emily: Emily is a 10-year-old girl who grows up to 3 meters tall.
Elmer Baokan: Elmer is an 11-year-old boy whose family hosts Emily during her stay and she becomes his adopted little sister.
Fred: Ten-year-old bundle of nerves and daredevil.
Betty: A village girl who Emily helps rebuild her hut.
Jonas: A boy that Emily likes.
Kinoobi: Kinoobi is Emily's panda backpack that comes to life.
Callas Kardamohn: 11-year-old girl who's jealous of Emily's size and competes with her for Jonas' attentions.
Georges Pao-Ju: Hangs out with Callas and Fiona.
Fiona Surayo: Admirer of Callas.

Episodes
? = The Innkeeper

French titles then English retitles:
 1. Le collier d'Amalia
 2. La fugue de Betty: Emily helps Betty rebuild her hut.
 3. Le Nid d'Aigle = The Eagle's Nest
 4. Émilie la sorcière
 5. La pêche aux crabes Crab Fishing
 6. Le protégé d'Émilie
 7. Kinoubi vide son sac
 8. L'inondation = The Flood
 9. La fête du renouveau
 10. La mare aux esprits
 11. La chasse aux papillons = The Butterfly Hunt'
 12. La guerre des cabanes
 13. Mauvaises nuits = Sleepless Nights
 14. La majorette
 15. Le secret d'Émilie = Emily's Secret
 16. Les trafiquants
 17. Le filet de Mendelssohn
 18. Georges dans les nuages
 19. La grande douche
 20. Toile d'araignée
 21. La nuit des oisiflores
 22. Du gros poisson
 23. La règle du jeu
 24. Kakis en folie
 25. Bain de boue
 26. La relève
 27. Tête de buffle
 28. Une géante dans la nuit
 29. Les gardes du corps
 30. Un nouveau parfum
 31. Le journal d'Émilie
 32. La panne d'eau
 33. Émilie fait son miel
 34. La nuit des étoiles filantes
 35. La fête d'Émilie
 36. Le serpent à trois yeux
 37. La poule perd la boule
 38. Le labyrinthe des kakis
 39. Georges passe à l'Est
 40. Le rapt de Kinoubi
 41. Votez pour moi
 42. Le concours de cerfs-volant
 43. Fred fait scission
 44. Panier de crabes
 45. L'arbre aux enfants
 46. Le secret du Shaman
 47. Mini Kinoubi
 48. La lampe magique
 49. La marchande
 50. Quand les jumelles s'en mêlent
 51. Le kaki de la justice
 52. Callas a disparu

Voices
Stephen Bent
Felicity Duncan
Candida Gubbins
Lesley Harcourt
Stuart Milligan
Dave Kitchen
Jo Lee
Juliet Prague
John Vernon

External links
series' profile on GaumontAnimation.com
 La petite géante - Présentation - Gulli retrieved 01-03-2013

description on Big Cartoon DataBase
page on TV France International

2010 French television series debuts
2010 French television series endings
2010s French animated television series
Chinese children's animated adventure television series
French children's animated adventure television series
Anime-influenced Western animated television series
Gaumont Animation
Animated television series about children
Television series by Cookie Jar Entertainment